Public buses form a significant part of public transport in Singapore, with over 3.6 million rides taken per day on average as of December 2021. There are 352 scheduled bus services, operated by SBS Transit, SMRT Buses, Tower Transit Singapore and Go-Ahead Singapore. The newest bus operator, Go-Ahead Singapore started operation on 4 September 2016. There are also around 5,800 buses currently in operation as of 2020.

History

Early history

Buses were first introduced into Singapore when the Singapore Traction Company (STC) was established under the Singapore Traction Company Ordinance of 1925 to replace the ill-fated electric tramway with a trolleybus system. The first trolleybuses began operations on 14 August 1926 between Joo Chiat Road and Tanjong Pagar whereas trams were phased out by 1927, with 66 trolleybuses plying on six routes with a mileage of 15” by 30 September that year. The STC later phased in motorbuses in 1929 when seven Dennis G-type buses began plying between Geylang and Finlayson Green before being transferred to serve Seletar.

However, the STC faced heavy competition from “mosquito-buses”, a form of informal paratransit operated using privately owned modified Ford Model T vehicles. Reckless driving of such “mosquito-buses” led to the government imposing heavy regulation on them, including having to stop at fixed stops (1923) and speed limits (1927). By 1935, “mosquito-buses” were replaced with more formalised bus services with the former “mosquito-bus” owners establishing what came to be known as the Chinese bus companies; these Chinese-operated buses connected the rural parts of Singapore to the town as opposed to the inner town services of the STC.

1950s-1960s: Post-war recovery and troubles

After the end of the war, the British Military Administration (BMA) was established to oversee the rebuilding of British institutions in its Malayan and Singapore colonies. Under the BMA, the STC slowly returned to normal operations with much of the dilapidated bus fleet replaced with newer motorbuses of the Albion make whereas the Chinese bus companies sought after numerous British makes such as Vulcan and Bedford. On the other hand, trolleybus operations were scaled down with only 50 new Ransomes, Sims & Jefferies-built trolleybuses procured as opposed the original 108 AEC-built trolleybuses from the pre-war period. Trolleybuses were eventually phased out by 1962 and were replaced by new Isuzu-built motorbuses.

Unfortunately the 1950s boded bad times for both the STC and the Chinese bus companies. General discontent on the poor working conditions, coupled with a highly politicised environment in the 1950s, led to many of their workers joining labour unions such as the STC Employee's Union and the Singapore Bus Workers’ Union (SBWU). Labour unrest led to transport paralysis, with two notorious incidents being the Hock Lee bus riots in 1955 (that year alone saw 57 strikes) and a 146-day-long Great STC Strike in 1956, the latter which further accelerated the decline of the STC when Chinese bus companies established their presence in the inner city with replacement bus services. Illegal “pirate taxis” also flourished during this time, offering a form of relief for stranded commuters although they were also notorious for unsafe driving practices and cost the bus companies and legitimate taxi drivers much losses.

The severity of the situation demanded immediate action from the government; in 1956 five Commissioners led by Mr L.C. Hawkins of the London Transport Executive published a report that recommended nationalisation of public transport but little was followed up by the government then.

1970s: Bus reorganization and mergers

Five years after the independence of Singapore from Malaysia in 1965, the government published a White Paper to study into an overhaul on bus services; this was followed by the Wilson Report published by Australian transport consultant R.P. Wilson, who not only reaffirmed the need for rationalisation of bus transport but also provided detailed recommendations on bus routes, frequencies, fares, vehicle specifications, bus stop and terminal design and maintenance standards.

In April 1971, the 10 Chinese bus companies were merged to form three larger regional bus companies, namely Amalgamated Bus Company in the west, Associated Bus Services in the east, and United Bus Company in the north. The STC retained its presence in central Singapore but lost its privileges previously granted by the 1925 STC Ordinance. Unable to cope with existing financial difficulties and competition from the regional companies, the STC eventually discontinued bus operations in 1971, with its remaining bus fleet being split up between the three regional companies. Service quality did not make great improvement however, with breakdowns and complaints from passengers being very common. Eventually in 1973, the Singapore government persuaded the three regional companies to merge to form a single entity called Singapore Bus Services (SBS).

SBS inherited many problems from its Chinese predecessors, including use of 14 non-standard bus models that frequently broke down, poor standards among the staff and inadequate infrastructure. Hence, the government seconded a Government Team of Officials to SBS in 1974 to overhaul the management and culture. Under the supervision of the GTO, SBS completely overhauled their bus fleet with new buses of usually the Albion Viking VK or Mercedes-Benz OF1413 makes and introduced a rigorous maintenance regime, improving the reliability of their buses greatly whereas a new disciplinary code was introduced, reducing complaints by half from 1979 to 1983. The government also helped to further alleviate the burden from SBS by introducing priority bus lanes to speed up bus services and introduced Scheme B bus services operated by private companies in 1974.

In 1977, SBS introduced into service its first double-decker buses, the Leyland Atlantean AN68 on route 86 between Tampines Way and Shenton Way.

In light of dissatisfaction over bus services in the Jurong area and requests for improved coverage, SBS started a reorganisation of bus services across the country, starting with Jurong. This consisted of a network of internal services serving a town, with external services terminating at a point in the town, along with bus interchanges to serve as such termini. Additional depots were also constructed, which SBS claimed gave them more control over bus operations.

In 1975, one-man operation (OMO) that charged a flat fare (for the case of SBS; TIBS opted for a distance fare) was introduced to cut manpower costs; this was followed by a one-man operated ticketing operation (OTS) in 1982. By 1984, bus conductors were completely phased out.

By 1978, SBS was in a healthy position to be publicly listed on the Singapore Stock Exchange as SBS (1978) Limited.

1980s-1990s: Market competition

By the 1980s, SBS had managed to modernise its fleet with new buses such as the Volvo B57, Mercedes-Benz OF1417 and the Leyland Atlantean AN68. By 1982 however, there was concerns that SBS might turn complacent. To ensure that SBS remain competitive, the government gave Ng Ser Miang of Singapore Shuttle Bus (SSB, one of the two operators of City Shuttle Service) the green light to set up a second operator. Named as Trans-Island Bus Service (TIBS), TIBS started operations the following year with a modest fleet of 90 Hino buses on routes 160 and 167. By 1988, the company had expanded its operations to encompass Woodlands and Yishun and operated 328 buses on 214 routes and had taken over SSB.

In 1984, SBS trialled its first air-conditioned buses, the Mercedes-Benz OF1413/61, on route 168. Following various trials of different air-conditioned demonstrators, SBS made its first bulk order for air-conditioned buses in 1989, the Scania N113CRB. When the Mass Rapid Transit (MRT) opened in 1987, bus services were further rationalised such that buses complemented the MRT by “feeding” commuters into the MRT network.  Fares for both buses and the MRT were also coordinated together from 1987 with the setting of the Public Transport Council that year whereas magnetic stored value cards were implemented across the entire bus network to streamline fare payment earlier in 1986.

In 1993, SBS introduced into service its first air-conditioned 12m double decker bus, the Leyland Olympian 3-axle. With a capacity of 131, its size earned it the nickname the “Superbus”. Three years later, TIBS phased in Singapore's first articulated buses with a length of 17.5m and a capacity of 150.

Late 1990s-2000s: Bus operators go multimodal

By 1996, SBS had expanded far beyond public bus operations to include tourist transport (SBS Leisure), taxis (Citycab) and engineering works (SBS Engineering) to name a few. To better manage its business, SBS (1978) Limited was rebranded as DelGro Corporation while public bus services were now managed by a new subsidiary named SBS. This new company also won a tender in 1999 to operate the North East MRT Line and the LRT systems in Sengkang and Punggol and was rebranded as SBS Transit in 2001 to reflect its multimodal nature. By 2003, Delgro Corporation merged with Comfort Group to form ComfortDelGro, one of the largest land transport operators in the world whose operations include Metroline in London and ComfortDelGro Australia. In 2001, TIBS was merged into SMRT Corporation and by 2004, the TIBS name was dropped by SMRT, with TIBS now being known as SMRT Buses.

During this period, there were also numerous changes outside corporate shakeups; in 1995, some bus services in Bukit Panjang, Sengkang and Punggol were transferred to TIBS from SBS but this was reversed in 1999 when SBS won the contract to operate the North East MRT Line. In return, bus services in Choa Chu Kang and Bukit Batok were transferred to TIBS that year. In 2002, the contactless EZ-Link card was introduced to replace the magnetic farecard and the first air-conditioned bus interchange opened in Toa Payoh; by the end of 2019, there will be 11 air-conditioned integrated transport hubs (ITH).

In 2006, SBS Transit introduced into service its first wheelchair accessible bus, the Volvo B9TL, on route 21 between Pasir Ris and St. Michael's. SSB wound up in 2007 with the discontinuation of the City Shuttle Service and its fleet was inherited by SMRT Buses. By 2009, both SBS Transit and SMRT Buses were renewing their respective bus fleets with new low-entry Scania K230UB buses and Mercedes-Benz OC500LE buses respectively.

LTA took on the role of central bus network planner from 2009, working with communities and the bus operators, SBS Transit (SBST) and SMRT Buses (SMRTB), to identify areas for bus improvements and to shift the focus to placing the commuter at the centre and taking a holistic approach in planning the bus network, taking into consideration development in the Rapid Transit System (RTS) network and other transport infrastructure. It is meant for their feedbacks, and any changes will be under the monthly updates, this has been brought through Bus Services Enhancement Programme. Under BSEP, about 80 new services are being introduced and 1000 buses are being added over five years.

Quality of Service (QoS) standards have also been tightened to reduce waiting time and reduce crowding. Now, those with increased loads run every 10 minutes or less during weekday peak hours in 2015. Feeder bus services have become more frequent too, with 95% of bus services now running at intervals of 10 minutes or less during the weekday peak periods, tightened from 85%.

It was also in the 21st century when the public bus operators looked into alternative fuel sources. In 2002, SBS purchased 12 CNG-powered Volvo B10BLE buses whereas the first hybrid buses and hydrogen fuel cell buses were introduced in 2010.

2010s: Government leans in

Since the early years of independence, the government has maintained its stance that heavy car usage is not sustainable for Singapore in the long term with a mixed-use of policies to both deter car usage and to push its people to take public transport. In December 2011, the North South MRT Line suffered its first major breakdowns with 127,000 passengers affected in the worst of them.

Amid growing criticism of the existing operating model and growing strain on the bus system, the main public transport statutory board Land Transport Authority (LTA) launched the Bus Service Enhancement Programme (BSEP), with 80 new and extended bus routes only within the general trend and 1000 government-funded buses, involving Volvo B9TL, Mercedes-Benz Citaro, Alexander Dennis Enviro500 and MAN A22 buses. introduced over a period of five years. In 2013, the last non-air-conditioned public bus, the Volvo Olympian 2-axle, was phased out of service whereas SMRT Buses introduced its first wheelchair-accessible articulated bus, the MAN A24 and in the following year, its first-ever double-decker bus, the Alexander Dennis Enviro500.

In 2014, LTA announced that it would replace the existing operating model with the Bus Contracting Model (BCM) from 2016 onwards. Modelled after the Transperth model with elements of the competitive tendering model from London Buses, LTA would own all bus assets and lease them out in regional packages to different bus operators for five years. The first bus package, the Bulim Bus Package, was awarded to Anglo-Australian company Tower Transit whereas Loyang was awarded to Go-Ahead. Both companies began their operations in 2016. The entire public bus system was fully transitioned into the BCM by September 2016 with SBS Transit and SMRT signing agreements with LTA to operate the remaining packages up to 2021 to 2026 after which they would be gradually opened up to competitive tendering.

With the BCM, bus operators introduced new buses with new features; in 2016 the first fully electric bus since the withdrawal of trolleybuses, the BYD K9A, was operated by Go-Ahead Singapore whereas the first buses with USB charging ports commenced service with SMRT that year. In 2017, two three-door buses — a double-deck MAN A95 and a single deck MAN A22 were trialled by Tower Transit and SMRT Buses respectively. New Volvo B5LH hybrid buses were also purchased from Volvo in 2018.

On 17 December 2018, LTA started a 6-month trial of on-demand public bus (ODPB) services. It allows commuters to request on-demand bus services within the Marina-Downtown and Joo Koon areas during off-peak hours on weekdays, and those heading from the CBD to Bedok or Tampines late-night hours. During the trial, regular bus services serving the areas specified will still be available, though at lower frequencies. However, the trials were unsuccessful and were eventually discontinued after 15 June 2019. As a result, services 400 and 402 were merged into Feeder service 400, from Shenton Way to Marina Barrage and Marina South Pier without the need to be suspended during the COVID-19 circuit breaker. Service NR7 is the first-night bus service to be discontinued, others were suspended from 7 April 2020.

In April 2019, SimplyGo, a new payment scheme that allows direct fare payment from bank cards, was introduced. Stroller restraint systems were also retrofitted on all wheelchair-accessible buses from July 2019 onward. In addition, LTA also experimented with assistive technology for commuters with special needs on routes 139 and 141 from January to July 2019.

2020s: Sustainable and accessible buses 

On 3 April 2020, 10 units of Yutong E12 electric buses debuted on SMRT Buses services 944 and 983, on Tower Transit services 66 and 990, and on Go-Ahead service 15. Then on 29 July 2020, 5 units of BYD K9 electric buses debuted on SBS Transit services 135, 162, and 807, with the rollout of the remaining 15 units completed in December 2020. On 27 October 2020, 10 units of Yutong E12DD double-decker electric buses debuted on SMRT service 983, on Tower Transit service 189, and on Go-Ahead services 83 and 118. On 25 August 2021, ST Engineering-Linkker LM312 which is fitted with 3 doors debuted on SBS Transit Service 38 and 40, on SMRT Buses services 176 and 976.  On 5 October 2021, ST Engineering Retrofitted Electric Bus, SG3100M which was once a diesel bus was retrofitted to an electric bus debuted on SMRT Buses Service 176. However, it was taken out of service the next day due to rolling back issues and charging connectivity issues.

All the Volvo Super Olympian buses were retired from revenue service on 8 April 2020, with the exception of SBS9889U being in revenue service until 11 November 2020. However, 2 buses have been preserved - 1 in Hong Kong for heritage purposes and the other in a special needs school in Ang Mo Kio, Singapore for practical purposes. A sole Mercedes-Benz O405G (Hispano Habit), TIB1238H which operated under Kranji Depot [KJDEP] has been preserved at Kranji Depot and has been deregistered with the "Off Peak" Number plate which has a Red Plate with White Text. November 2020 marked the last day of operation of non-wheelchair-accessible buses with TIB1242U, a Hispano Habit-bodied Mercedes-Benz O405G on Service 169 being the last non-wheelchair-accessible bus on revenue service.

On 1 December 2020, all public buses in Singapore became fully wheelchair-accessible.

COVID-19 pandemic
When the COVID-19 pandemic first emerged in the beginning of 2020, the Singapore government introduced the circuit breaker measures to curb the spread of the virus. Under these measures, selected public bus services were suspended in two tranches, with adjustments made later. The first tranche of suspended bus services took effect from Wednesday, 8 April 2020, while the second tranche of bus service suspensions started from Wednesday, 15 April 2020. The suspensions lasted till Monday, 1 June 2020; Express and City Direct services all resumed after 1 June 2020, and several recreational and discretionary services were suspended until 30 June 2022, after which all services except 401 were withdrawn.

Bus 401 was eventually reinstated on 4 June 2022  while the rest of the suspended bus services were withdrawn from 30 June 2022.

Installation of protective screens 
Since 2016, protective screens were installed to protect bus drivers from potential abuse by passengers. This was expanded during the COVID-19 pandemic to protect from the virus as well.

Vehicles
Singapore's buses consist of single deck and double deck buses and they are operated by all four operators, SBS Transit, SMRT Buses, Tower Transit Singapore and Go-Ahead Singapore. Articulated buses are operated by SMRT Buses, with several units being transferred to SBS Transit and Tower Transit Singapore as part of the Seletar and Sembawang-Yishun Bus Packages respectively under the Bus Contracting Model (BCM).

Routes

Singapore has many different bus services plying through the island. These bus routes are categorised accordingly:
 Trunk: Routes that ply between towns. (e.g. 7, 21, 53M, 133, 162M, 851, 960)
 Feeder: Services that operate within a neighbourhood. (e.g. 293, 334, 386, 410W, 812, 901M)
 Short Trip: Routes that operate short haul trips of services which cover high demand sectors of the parent route. (e.g. 3A, 70B, 147A, 222A, 502A, 857A, 965A)
 Jurong Industrial Service: Routes that service the Jurong and Tuas industrial areas. Operated exclusively by SBS Transit. All Jurong Industrial Services are under Jurong West Bus Package. (e.g. 247, 249, 251, 258)
 Express: Routes that stop at selected stops and generally run on expressways or long stretches of express sector for faster travel between several towns. (e.g. 43e, 174e, 502, 854e, 951E)
 City Direct: Service connecting passengers directly to and from the Central Business District during peak hours. Previously operated by private operators. (e.g. 655, 661, 666, 670)
 Cross Border Services: Services that cross the Causeway or the Second Link into Malaysia. (i.e. 160, 170, 170X, 950)
 Resorts World Sentosa Bus services: Bus services that operate in and out of Resorts World Sentosa. Services run on weekends and Public Holidays. (i.e. RWS8)
 Scheme B Bus services: Bus services that are operated by private operators at peak timings. (Note that these services are not very well mentioned by LTA) (i.e. 621, 623, 625, 640)

Bus packages 

Under the Bus Contracting Model, bus services are grouped into bus packages, each of which is operated by a bus operator.

See also

Transport in Singapore
Rail transport in Singapore

References

Further reading
 Ilsa Sharp, (2005), SNP:Editions, The Journey: Singapore's Land Transport Story.

External links
 Ministry of Transport website
 Land Transport Authority website
 Public Transport Council website
 TransitLink website
 SBS Transit website
 SMRT Corporation website
 Tower Transit Singapore website
 Go-Ahead Singapore website
 Bus Arrival Time SG